The 2016 NHL Winter Classic (officially the 2016 Bridgestone NHL Winter Classic) was an outdoor ice hockey game played in the National Hockey League (NHL) on January 1, 2016, at Gillette Stadium in Foxborough, Massachusetts. The eighth edition of the Winter Classic, it matched the Montreal Canadiens against the Boston Bruins; the Canadiens won, 5–1, a significant event in one of the NHL's best-known rivalries. A Bruins and Canadiens alumni game was also played on December 31, 2015. The Boston Pride women's professional hockey team played before the alumni game against Les Canadiennes of the Canadian Women's Hockey League to a 1–1 tie in the first ever 2016 Outdoor Women's Classic (officially the Outdoor Women's Classic presented by Scotiabank).

Teams
The Bruins made their second appearance in the Winter Classic, as they played against the Philadelphia Flyers in the 2010 NHL Winter Classic held in Boston's Fenway Park; Massachusetts became the first market to serve as repeat host of the Winter Classic. Early reports dating back to December 2014 by TSN's Bob McKenzie indicated that Boston was the league's first choice in hosting the game.

To accommodate the event, Gillette Stadium's primary tenant, the New England Patriots, played the last two games of their 2015 season on the road. The Bruins introduced a new third jersey for the game and it featured the team's original logo, as virtually a re-creation of their inaugural 1924–25 NHL season brown/gold sweaters worn while playing their home games in Matthews Arena, which opened in 1910, now on the campus of Northeastern University.  (Matthews also was the first arena for the Boston Celtics and the WHA New England Whalers, who are now the Carolina Hurricanes.)

This was the first Winter Classic appearance and third outdoor game for the Canadiens; the team previously played 2003 NHL Heritage Classic against the hosting Edmonton Oilers and the 2011 NHL Heritage Classic against the hosting Calgary Flames. The team also played in a new third jersey and used a logo from the 1920s.

The two teams are long-time rivals. As of the end of the 2014–15 NHL season, the two teams have played each other 729 times during the regular season, 177 times during the playoffs, including nine game sevens. The two teams also held a special alumni game between the two teams, on December 31 at Gillette Stadium.

Game summary

In the most lopsided score in the Winter Classic, four Montreal players combined to score five goals en route to a 5–1 victory against Boston. In his first game since suffering a hand injury on November 22, Canadiens forward Brendan Gallagher recorded a goal and an assist. Goalie Mike Condon made 27 saves for Montreal. Matt Beleskey scored the Bruins' only goal.

Number in parenthesis represents the player's total in goals or assists to that point of the season

Team rosters

 Ben Scrivens and Jonas Gustavsson dressed as the back-up goaltenders. Neither entered the game.

Scratches
Montreal Canadiens: Greg Pateryn, Devante Smith-Pelly, Jarred Tinordi
Boston Bruins: Zach Trotman, Brad Marchand, Tyler Randell

Alumni Game

In the Alumni Game on New Year's Eve, the Bruins defeated the Canadiens 5–4 in a shootout. The Canadiens alumni included Guy Carbonneau, Larry Robinson and Jose Theodore with the coaches including Guy Lafleur and Jacques Demers, while the Bruins alumni included Cam Neely, Terry O'Reilly, Mark Recchi and Ray Bourque with the coaches including Derek Sanderson, Lyndon Byers, Mike Milbury and Don "Grapes" Cherry.

Bruins' former anthem singer Rene Rancourt performed O Canada and The Star-Spangled Banner at the alumni game.

Television
The game was televised in the United States on NBC, with commentators Mike Emrick, Eddie Olczyk, and Pierre McGuire.

In Canada, it was the second consecutive Winter Classic to be televised under the Rogers Media contract, but for the first time the English-language broadcast was shown on Sportsnet instead of on CBC Television and the Hockey Night in Canada banner. Commentary was provided by Jim Hughson, Craig Simpson, and Glenn Healy. For the second consecutive time, the game was broadcast in French on TVA Sports (with commentators Félix Séguin and Patrick Lalime, and reporter Renaud Lavoie) as part of TVA's sub-licensing agreement with Rogers.

Television ratings
The 2016 NHL Winter Classic had the lowest ratings of any Winter Classic in the United States to date, with an average of less than 3 million American viewers watching the game.

Pregame/Anthems/Entertainment 
Prior to the game American Authors performed

The Boston Pops performed Duel Of The Fates during the team introductions

The national anthems were performed by Simple Plan (O Canada) and The Voice season 9 winner Jordan Smith accompanied by the Boston Pops (The Star-Spangled Banner)

Nate Ruess performed during the first intermission while Simple Plan performed during the second intermission

References

NHL Winter Classic
Winter Classic
2016 in ice hockey
Boston Bruins games
Montreal Canadiens games
NHL Winter Classic
NHL Winter Classic
Sports competitions in Foxborough, Massachusetts
Ice hockey competitions in Massachusetts